Masse may refer to
Masse (surname)
Massè, an arrondissement in Benin
, a billiards, pool, and snooker cueing technique that produces a curving shot
Masei, the 43rd weekly portion in the annual Jewish cycle of Torah reading
Pointe de la Masse, a mountain in France
Levy en Masse Act 1803 by the Parliament of the United Kingdom
Crampe en masse, a Canadian comedy duo
Crampe en masse et le hot dog géant, an album by Crampe en masse
Crampe en Masse (album) by Crampe en masse
En Masse Entertainment, a Seattle-based PC and mobile game-publishing company
Levée en masse, the policy of military conscription adopted after the French Revolution of 1789

See also
Mass (disambiguation)